is a Japanese yuri manga written and illustrated by Miman which was first serialized in Ichijinsha's Comic Yuri Hime on November 18, 2016, and is licensed in English by Kodansha USA as the company's first yuri release. An anime television series adaptation by Passione and Studio Lings will premiere in April 2023.

Plot
Hime is a high school girl who deeply cares about her image as a sweet, helpful princess but on the inside only cares about herself. So when she accidentally injures a café manager named Mai, she is willing to cover some shifts to keep her facade intact. Hime ends up working as a waitress at a place that is part café, part theater, where all the waitresses pretend to be students at a fictional all-girls boarding school known as Liebe Girls Academy. Hime finds herself drawn to another waitress at the café, who in front of the customers gives Hime love and devotion like she has never known. However, behind the scenes, the girl seems to hate her guts.

Characters
The name represents a character's real name / Liebe Girls Academy name.

Hime dreams of marrying rich and living an easy life of wealth. To achieve her dream she always presents a charming persona to endear herself to others, leaving few to know her true character.

 
A beautiful and graceful girl who plays the role of a kind senpai at the salon. She very quickly comes to dislike Hime, since unbeknownst to Hime, the two are old friends who parted on bad terms.

A shy girl who has been Hime's friend since middle school and actually knows Hime's true personality. Kanoko comes to work at the café after following Hime there.

Sumika plays a cool and collected senpai in the café, however outside of work she is considered a gyaru. Sumika becomes more involved with Kanoko once she begins to believe that Kanoko may harbour unrequited feeling for Hime.

The manager of the café. Mai guilts Hime into working at the cafe after Hime accidentally injured her arm.

Oone of the first waitresses hired at the café alongside Sumika, however she has since moved to become part of the kitchen staff instead.

A former member of the café. When she worked there, she played a seductress character who got between Nene and Sumika's personal and professional lives.

A new member of the kitchen staff, she works alongside Nene and while she doesn't fully understand the concept of the café she still finds it charming.

Media

Manga

Anime
An anime television series adaptation was announced on May 14, 2022. It will be produced by Passione and Studio Lings, and directed by Hijiri Sanpei, with scripts written by Naoki Hayashi, character designs handled by Taisuke Iwasaki, and music composed by Megumi Ōhashi. The series is set to premiere on April 6, 2023, on AT-X and other networks. At Anime NYC 2022, Crunchyroll announced that they had licensed the series.

Reception
Rebecca Silverman from Anime News Network gave the first volume an overall B+ grade. Silverman noted that the first volume was "much more interested in the parodic aspects of the story, though, so readers should be prepared for more humor than actual yearning glances, and a certain degree of familiarity with Class S yuri is probably going to make the book more enjoyable". Anime UK News gave the first volume 8/10, praising its strong setup and additional German translation notes.

In 2018, Yuri Is My Job! was part of the top 20 finalists featured in the Niconico and Da Vinci's Next Manga Awards. The series has also been featured on BookWalker's top-selling manga for 2019 and 2020.

References

External links
 Official Japanese manga website
 Official English manga website
 Official anime website 
 

2016 manga
2010s LGBT literature
2023 anime television series debuts
Anime series based on manga
AT-X (TV network) original programming
Crunchyroll anime
Ichijinsha manga
LGBT in anime and manga
Passione (company)
School life in anime and manga
Upcoming anime television series
Yuri (genre) anime and manga